Ute Mountain is a  summit located in Taos County, New Mexico, United States.

Description
Ute Mountain is part of the Taos Mountains which are a subset of the Sangre de Cristo Mountains. The isolated landmark is the highest point of the Cerro del Yuta Wilderness and Rio Grande del Norte National Monument which is administered by the Bureau of Land Management. The remote mountain is situated 35 miles north of the town of Taos and four miles south of the New Mexico–Colorado border. Ute Mountain is a free-standing, dacitic, extinct Pliocene volcanic cone set within the Taos Plateau volcanic field. The slopes of the mountain are covered with stands of pinyon pine, ponderosa pine, aspen and Douglas fir. Precipitation runoff from the mountain drains to the Rio Grande which flows through a gorge along the western base of the mountain.

Etymology
The mountain is also known in Spanish as "Cerro del Yuta" (Mountain of the Ute). The origin of the word Ute is unknown; it is first attested as Yuta in Spanish documents. The mountain is named after the Ute people whose self-designation is Núuchi-u, meaning 'the people'. The state of Utah is also named after the Ute people. This landform's toponym has been officially adopted by the United States Board on Geographic Names, and has appeared in publications since at least 1875.

Gallery

See also
 List of mountain peaks of New Mexico
 
 Rio Grande rift

References

External links

 Ute Mountain: weather forecast

Mountains of New Mexico
Mountains of Taos County, New Mexico
North American 3000 m summits
Pliocene volcanism